

Gmina Orzysz is an urban-rural gmina (administrative district) in Pisz County, Warmian-Masurian Voivodeship, in northern Poland.

The gmina contains part of the protected area called Masurian Landscape Park.

Villages
Apart from the town of Orzysz, Gmina Orzysz contains the villages and settlements of Aleksandrowo, Chmielewo, Cierzpięty, Czarne, Dąbrówka, Drozdowo, Dziubiele, Dziubiele Małe, Gaudynki, Golec, Góra, Górki, Gorzekały, Grądy, Grądy Podmiejskie, Grzegorze, Kamieńskie, Kępa, Klusy, Leśniczówka Koźle, Matyszczyki, Mikosze, Mikosze-Osada, Nowa Wieś, Nowe Guty, Odoje, Ogródek, Okartowo, Okartowo-Przystanek, Okartowo-Tartak, Osiki, Pianki, Rostki Skomackie, Rzęśniki-Leśniczówka, Stefanowo, Strzelniki, Suchy Róg, Sumki, Szwejkówko, Tuchlin, Tuchlin-Gajówka, Ublik, Wężewo, Wierzbiny, Zastrużne and Zdęgówko.

Neighbouring gminas
Gmina Orzysz is bordered by the gminas of Biała Piska, Ełk, Mikołajki, Miłki, Pisz, Stare Juchy and Wydminy.

References
Polish official population figures 2006

Orzysz
Pisz County